Fauldhouse railway station is a railway station serving Fauldhouse in West Lothian, Scotland. It is located on the Shotts Line, 23¼ miles (37 km) west of  towards .

The station is almost at the halfway point of the Shotts Line between Glasgow and Edinburgh. The station is located on the south-western edge of the village of Fauldhouse.

Services 

Monday to Saturday, there is generally an hourly service eastbound to Edinburgh Waverley and westbound towards Glasgow Central (less frequently in the late evening).

There are no ticket collection or purchasing facilities at the station and it is unmanned with limited car parking facilities.

Sundays see a 2-hourly service in both directions to Edinburgh and Glasgow.

See also
Fauldhouse and Crofthead railway station

References

Sources

External links 
Video of Fauldhouse railway station

Railway stations in West Lothian
Railway stations served by ScotRail
Railway stations in Great Britain opened in 1869
Former Caledonian Railway stations
1869 establishments in Scotland